Ivan Thys (29 April 1897 – 15 February 1982) was a Belgian footballer. He played in sixteen matches for the Belgium national football team between 1923 and 1926.

References

External links
 

1897 births
1982 deaths
Belgian footballers
Belgium international footballers
Footballers from Antwerp
Association football forwards
Beerschot A.C. players